The 1987–88 Argentine Primera B Nacional was the 2nd. season of second division professional of football in Argentina. A total of 22 teams competed; the champion and runner-up were promoted to Argentine Primera División. Deportivo Mandiyú of Corrientes Province won the championship, promoting to Primera along with San Martín de Tucumán. 

On the other hand, Guaraní Antonio Franco, Ferro Carril Oeste (General Pico) and Gimnasia y Esgrima de Jujuy were relegated.

Club information

1: Property of Huracán Corrientes.

Standings
Deportivo Mandiyú was declared champion and was automatically promoted to Primera División, and the teams placed 2nd to 10th qualified for the Second Promotion Playoff.

Second Promotion Playoff
The Second Promotion Playoff or Torneo Reducido was played by the teams placed 2nd to 10th in the overall standings: Quilmes (2nd), who entered in the Semifinals, Cipolletti (3rd) who entered in the Second Round, Chaco For Ever (4th), Tigre (5th), Belgrano (6th), Huracán (7th), Colón (8th), Atlético Tucumán (9th), Douglas Haig (10th); the champion of Primera B Metropolitana: Talleres (RE), San Martin (T) and Estación Quequén, both winners of Zonales Noroeste y Sureste from Torneo del Interior. The winner was promoted to Primera División.

1: Qualified because of sport advantage.

Relegation

1: They kept the points earned in previous editions of the Primera B Metropolitana, although the category was new.
2: Despite they were promoted to play this season the points earned in previous editions of the Primera B Metropolitana were used to calculate averages, plus those achieved in the previous two tournaments.

Note: Clubs with indirect affiliation with AFA are relegated to their respective league of his province according to the Argentine football league system, while clubs directly affiliated face relegation to Primera B Metropolitana. Clubs with direct affiliation are all from Greater Buenos Aires, with the exception of Newell's, Rosario Central, Central Córdoba and Argentino de Rosario, all from Rosario, and Unión and Colón from Santa Fe.

Relegation Playoff Matches
Each tie was played on a home-and-away two-legged basis. 
This season, Central Córdoba (SdE) had to play against Güemes (SdE) from the Liga Santiagueña de Fútbol.

Central Córdoba (SdE) remains in Primera B Nacional.

Top scorers

See also
1987–88 in Argentine football

References

Primera B Nacional seasons
Prim
1987 in South American football leagues
1988 in South American football leagues